The Concordia Political Alliance (CPA) is a political party in Sint Maarten founded in 2010 by Jeffry Richardson, a one-time executive assistant to former Democratic Party commissioners Roy Marlin and Louie Laveist. At the last general elections before the dissolution of the Netherlands Antilles, 17 September 2010, the party won 1.0% of the popular vote and none of the 15 possible seats.

References

Political parties in Sint Maarten
Political parties established in 2010
2010 establishments in Sint Maarten